Rose Wangui is a Kenyan reporter who received the Knight International Journalism Award, which was presented to her at the International Center for Journalists (ICFJ) 35th Annual Awards Dinner in 2019.

References 

Living people
Kenyan journalists
Kenyan women journalists
21st-century journalists
Year of birth missing (living people)